The 2015 China-ASEAN International Youth Football Tournament was the 1st edition of the China-ASEAN International Youth Football Tournament. The competition began on 4 March and ended on 11 March 2015.

Participants

Group stage

Knockout stage

Third place

Final

References

Sport in Guangxi